Brian M. Stoltz is currently a professor of chemistry at the California Institute of Technology. The primary focus of his research is chemical synthesis with an emphasis on expanding the scope of allylic alkylation for the preparation of complex molecules possessing unique structural, biological, and physical properties. His research involves the total synthesis of natural products such as dragmacidin F and (–)-cyanthiwigin F, and development of synthetic reactions to access quaternary stereocenters.  Specifically, he has focused on the allylic alkylation of enolates, developing an enantioselective variant in 2004.

Education

Stoltz received undergraduate degrees in Chemistry and German from Indiana University of Pennsylvania in 1993. As an undergraduate he spent a year abroad at the Ludwig Maximilian University of Munich.  He went on to earn his M.S. and Ph.D. at Yale University, where he studied organic chemistry under the supervision of John L. Wood, completing his studies in 1997. Upon completion of his graduate work, he held an NIH post-doctoral fellowship appointment in the laboratory of E. J. Corey at Harvard University from 1998 to 2000.

Career and research
Stoltz is the Editor-in-Chief of Tetrahedron.  At present he is also an associate editor for the Beilstein Journal of Organic Chemistry.

Awards and honors
 Fellow of the American Chemical Society
 2018 American Chemical Society, Award for Creative Work in Synthetic Organic Chemistry
 2017 Richard P. Feynman Prize for Excellence in Teaching, California Institute of Technology
 National Science Foundation Presidential Early Career Award for Scientists and Engineers (2002)
 American Association for the Advancement of Science (2006)
 Sackler Prize (2009)
 ACS E. J. Corey Award (2009)
 Tetrahedron Young Investigator Award (2010)
 Mukaiyama Award (2015)

References

California Institute of Technology faculty
Yale University alumni
1970 births
Living people